Carpark Records is an independent record label based in Washington, D.C.

History 
Carpark Records was established by Todd Hyman in 1999 in New York City. In 2005, the label relocated to Washington, D.C.

Carpark has subsidiary labels. Acute Records, established in 2002, reissues obscure post-punk records under the guidance of Dan Selzer. Paw Tracks, established in 2003, releases music by Animal Collective and associated solo acts Avey Tare and Panda Bear Wax Nine is another partner label.

Company Records, an imprint of Carpark, was established in partnership with Chaz Bear from Toro Y Moi.

In 2015, Carpark held a 16-year anniversary celebration accompanied by a basketball-themed picture disc compilation.

Artists

 242.pilots
 Adventure
 Baldi/Gerycz Duo
 Beach House
 Belong
 Benny Boeldt
 Casino Versus Japan
 Chandos
 Class Actress
 Cloud Nothings
 Dan Deacon
 Dent May
 Dinky
 Dog Bite
 Ducks Ltd.
 EAR PWR
 Ecstatic Sunshine
 Ed Schrader's Music Beat
 Emily Reo
 Erin Anne
 Evan Gipson
 Fat Tony
 GEMS
 Greg Davis
 Greys
 GRMLN
 Introverted Dancefloor
 Jake Mandell
 Keith Fullerton Whitman
 Kid 606
 Kit Clayton
 Laumė (fka MADEIRA)
 Les Sins
 Les Sins
 Lesser Gonzalez Alvarez
 Lexie Mountain Boys 
 Light Pollution
 Madeline Kenney
 Marumari
 Melkbelly – on Wax Nine Records (subsidiary)
 Memory Tapes
 Miranda Winters – on Wax Nine Records (subsidiary)
 Montag
 Ogurusu Norihide
 Over the Atlantic
 Palm
 Popstrangers
 Prince Rama
 Remy
 Rituals of Mine
 Sad13
 Safety Scissors
 Samuel Muzaliwa
 Signer aka Bevan Smith
 Skylar Spence
 So Takahashi
 Speedy Ortiz
 Takagi Masakatsu
 TEEN
 The Beths
 Wendyfix
 WZT Hearts
 Young Magic

See also
 Carpark Records artists
 Carpark Records albums
 List of record labels

References

External links
 

American independent record labels
Music companies based in Washington, D.C.